Zoom Lens was an independent Los Angeles-based record label founded and operated by Faye Yim from 2009 to 2022. The label was created "in order to explore the implications of popular culture on the human condition and the duality artistic expression discovered through an intersection of both local and international sounds."

History

In 2009, Zoom Lens was founded by Faye Yim, who was at the time "fascinated with Japanese harsh noise and film" and sought out to release music due to the influence of the Orange County experimental music scene.

The first Zoom Lens release was an album by Yim under the name of Yuko Imada entitled "Ome," which came packaged as a CD-R contained in a DVD case soaked in the artist's own blood.

In January 2015, Zoom Lens had its first video broadcast on national television through Adult Swim with Meishi Smile and their video "AJS."

On March 15, 2016, Zoom Lens had its first official SXSW showcase.

On February 22, 2022, the end of Zoom Lens was announced from a message on the label's site, while a new label and art collective, Meta Physica, was announced by Yim.

Sound

Zoom Lens' sound had been categorized as "unpredictable", exploring sounds ranging from ambient music, noise music, chiptune, electropop, shoegaze and other forms of experimental music. The sound of Zoom Lens had been described as "broadening definitions of punk," as well as "dreamy indie with 8-bit and rave euphoria."

Imagery

Aesthetics
The Fader has noted Zoom Lens as "one of the most aesthetically compelling labels in existence.".

Many of Zoom Lens' images revolved around the concept of burnt photography. This practice was first put to use for an EP by Party Girl released in 2011. The imagery was said to be providing feelings about the disconnection towards memories, a commentary on "silver age" Japanese idol music (or Kayōkyoku) and the over-saturation of the digital music market. This theme was also explored in Zoom Lens merchandise.

In 2014, a shirt based on a manipulated image of Yukiko Okada was released on Zoom Lens' official site, with a banner reading "burn a face of forgotten idols to obfuscate the memories of the truth you lost." In a Red Bull Music Academy interview, Yim noted that they had felt a sadness in Okada's music and story, and "wanted to show people that Okada was a real person with real feelings, and that we all have such humanity."

Music critic Adam Harper has noted some of the imagery as "a conscious attempt at confronting and defamiliarising the visual objectification of women (and its consequences)."

Influences

East Asian and global influence
The label had been referenced as one of "the best places for Japanese-inspired indie pop in the online underground," and it hosted a variety of online shows with Japanese venue 2.5D.

Red Bull Music Academy had also noted Zoom Lens' international roster, which "encompasses artists from Japan, the Philippines, Singapore and the US." and "[spans] cultural and continental canyons through our digital world." 
 
While Yim had identified Zoom Lens as something far more encompassing beyond their own personal views they have noted much of the label was established due to the influence of being a fourth generation Japanese (or Yonsei (Japanese diaspora)) and Chinese American, expressing that their identity felt rather unusual, lonely and that Japanese culture in America is still seen as taboo.

The label had ultimately sought out for the artists to "represent themselves for who they are, not just for the assumptions people make about their country." Despite heavy East Asian influence, Yim had said that the label was also about being unashamed of who you are and sharing the weight of existence.

Artists

Former

BEDSPACER
Kenneth Takanami 
bod [包家巷]
The Bilinda Butchers
Ceramiks
LLLL
Mark Redito
MEISHI SMILE
mus.hiba
oh my muu
Reinabe
Plaster Cast
Tallinn
Thought Tempo
Xyloid
U-Pistol / Moon Mask
Yoshino Yoshikawa

Discography

References

External links
Official site

Record labels established in 2009
American independent record labels